Alexander Parish is a New York art dealer and the joint former owner of the Salvator Mundi by Leonardo da Vinci; he appears in the 2021 film, The Lost Leonardo.

References

Living people
American art dealers
Year of birth missing (living people)